is a 2012 Japanese anime television series produced by Toei Animation and the ninth installment in Izumi Todo's Pretty Cure metaseries, featuring the seventh generation of Cures. The series is written by Shōji Yonemura, who is best known as the head writer of Glass Fleet and Kamen Rider Kabuto. The character designs were done by Toshie Kawamura, who previously worked on the character designs for Yes! PreCure 5. The initial members consisted of 5 members for the first time in 5 years since Yes! Pretty Cure 5, The order of the color scheme is pink, red, yellow, green, and blue is the same as Yes! Pretty Cure 5, but the difference is that all five are the same classmates in the second year of middle school, and in this work, additional members and purple also does not appear. The illustration book of her works was released on February 12, 2014. The series aired on All-Nippon News Network (ANN)'s TV Asahi network between February 5, 2012 and January 27, 2013, replacing Suite PreCure♪ in its initial timeslot, and is succeeded by DokiDoki! PreCure. A film was released in Japanese theaters on October 26, 2012. The series' main topic is fairy tales and happiness. A novel was released in 2016, which serves as a series epilogue taking place 10 years after the events of the anime.

The series was adapted into English by Saban Brands under its SCG Characters unit, under the name Glitter Force and was released as a Netflix exclusive outside of Asia and in multiple languages on December 18, 2015. As of May 24, 2017, the Glitter Force trademark and the license was transferred to Toei Animation. Hasbro currently owns the rights to the brand alongside other Saban Brands entertainment assets as of June 14, 2018. It is the second series in the franchise to receive an English-dubbed adaptation following the original Pretty Cure series.

Plot
When Pierrot's minions from the Bad End Kingdom (Saban: Shadow Realm) try to revive him by harnessing negative energy from the people of Earth, the queen sends the messenger Candy to assemble a team of five magical girls. The series follows the formation of the team and the adventures of the girls as they try to fight off their enemies to collect the magical tokens called Cure Decors (Saban: Glitter Charms) that will enable them to upgrade their powers and revive the queen.

Characters
Characters are listed by their Japanese names.

Main characters
The girls place the items in a compact case, applying the compact powder to themselves while shouting  to transform.

Smile Pretty Cures
 / 

 The main protagonist. She is energetic and optimistic, but also something of a klutz. Her theme color is pink.

 / 

 Akane is the 14-year-old star member of the school's volleyball team. She is from Osaka and speaks with a Kansai dialect. Akane's family runs an okonomiyaki restaurant, where she sometimes works. Her theme color is orange.

 / 

 Yayoi is a 13-year-old aspiring artist who enjoys drawing and painting action hero characters. Though timid on the outside, shy about her work and sometimes prone to crying, Yayoi is loyal, diligent, and headstrong when it comes to things and people she cares about. Her theme color is yellow.

 / 

 Nao is the 14-year-old captain of the school's soccer team. She is straightforward and reliable with a strong sense of justice, though she gets very frustrated when things don't go her way. She is the oldest of six siblings, taking on a motherly role in her family. Her theme color is green.

 / 

 Reika is the 14-year-old student council vice president and a member of the school's archery club. She is intelligent, serious, elegant and kind-hearted, but has a frightening temper once her patience reaches its limits. Her theme color is blue.

Mascots

 A lamb-like pixie with light pink fur and long curly fluffy yellow ears with pink bows who is the team's Mascot character, she is childishly cheerful while quite cute and fashionable in having her ears being styled like hair. Candy is sent to Earth by Royale Queen to recruit the Pretty Cure and regain the stolen Cure Decors, becoming a vital member of the team by providing the Tiara Charms that enable the girls to assume Tiara Mode for team attacks and then using the Royale Clock to boost their power. In the series finale, Joker having long knew she was connected to the Miracle Jewel, Candy's mission was revealed to a means of preparing her to succeed Queen as new ruler of Märchenland. This results on Candy gaining the ability to transform into the human-like  once the Cure Decors are finally gathered, helping her friends in the final battle before assuming her role as Märchenland's sovereign.

Pop is Candy's older brother, a male lion-like fairy/pixie with light orange fur and an orange mane who takes pride in his masculinity to hate being called "cute" yet gets bashful whenever commented as "fierce and cool" by Yayoi. He alongside Candy were in charge of searching for the five chosen ones to become Pretty Cure. He reunites with Candy once she assembled the group, explaining their mission and giving them the Charm Chest. Pop normally remains in Märchenland but usually visits the group during important matters. He is capable of using ninjutsu arts including transformation into various forms to assist the Pretty Cure in battle.

 The Queen of Märchenland, and the origin of the fairies/pixies who regard her as their mother. When Märchenland was attacked by Pierrot, the Royal Queen lost the Cure Decors to her opponent and is forced to sacrifice herself in sealing Pierrot while her body ends up in a petrified state. She sends Candy to search for the Pretty Cure in order to recover the Cure Decors and restore her power. Though the Pretty Cure gathered the Cure Decors, the Royal Queen chooses to spend their power to give the girls their Princess forms during their battle against Pierrot with the girls gathering more Cure Decors to make another attempt. However, the Royal Queen revealed her restoration was a ruse when she protected Candy from Joker, revealing the pixie to be her successor as queen while giving her the Miracle Jewel to use at her discretion.

Bad End Kingdom 
The , the primary antagonists of the series, are a group who strive to revive Emperor Pierrot by smearing the page of the magic book in their possession with the contents of a black paint tube which is a manifestation of Pierrot's will. This creates a spatial field called a Dark Zone that amplifies negativity and places those unprotected into a deep despair while their negative energy is extracted and collected into the book. This proceeds advances a clock-like meter called the "Wheel of Doom" which counts down Pierrot's resurrection. The leaders and the Akanbe are based on clowns. The three commanders spearheading the Bad End Kingdom’s attacks are later revealed to be Märchenland fairies that were drafted by Joker exploiting their resentment over being constantly alienated for being fairy tale villains. They are eventually purified back to their original fairy forms by Miyuki and return to Märchenland after Pierrot’s defeat.

The main antagonist of the series, his goal is wiping out all hope in existence until only despair remains. Prior to the series, Pierrot attacks Märchenland and steals the Cure Decors from the Royal Queen before she used the last of her strength to seal him away. For the first half of the series, the Shadow Realm minions collect negative energy from humans to revive Pierrot with Joker completing it. Through obliterated when the Pretty Cure gained their Princess forms, Pierrot survived with a surviving fragment reforming into an egg that gradually increases in size from an infusion of negative energy used to restore him. Once restored, absorbing Joker while creating his army of living shadow monsters, Pierrot evolves into a new form and almost destroys the world until being permanently killed by the Pretty Cure.

The secondary antagonist of the series, Joker is Pierrot's harlequin-like intermediary to the Three Commanders, a playful yet sadistic being who uses his playing cards for various purposes and creates Akanbe Noses from his headdress. Being overseeing the Three Commanders' progress, Joker also seeks the Miracle Jewel with the intention of destroying it and anything else that gives others hopes. Following the Commanders' final defeat, Joker creates the Bad End Precure to distract the girls during Pierrot's revival while he attempts to kill Candy after she transformed into what he assumed is the Miracle Jewel. Once Pierrot's resurrection is complete, Joker reveals himself as a fragment of his master's being as he dissolves into black paint while allowing himself to be absorbed by Pierrot. Joker returns as the main antagonist of the series epilogue novel, having survived Pierrot's destruction as an immortal embodiment of despair and used Miyuki's book to feed on the adult Precures' negative energy to gradually reconstitute a physical form as  before being defeated.

 An anthropomorphic gray wolf with violet eyes and white hair who wears a blue leather biker's outfit, violently bitter and rude in personally. He looks down on peoples' hopes and dreams, expressing disgust towards the Precures' ideals. Wolfrun is based on the Big Bad Wolf in fairy tales such as the Three Little Pigs and Little Red Riding Hood. He is eventually purified back to his original form .

 A red-skinned troll with an afro and horns who carries a large club, based on the oni in fairy tales such as Momotaro. Akaoni is not as intelligent compared to the other villains, preferring to use his own strength when fighting his opponents. He is eventually purified back to his original form .

 Majorina is an elderly witch, based on the witches in fairy tales such as Snow White. She devises various badly-named inventions to use against the girls, usually effective as the result of her fellow commanders thoughtlessly throwing them into the human world. Majorina can also temporary transform into a youthful and beautiful version of herself to fight opponents directly, creating clones of herself. She is eventually purified back to her original form .

 Akanbes are clown-like monsters created when an Akanbe Nose is combined with an object such as a volleyball or a tree. The standard red-nosed Akanbes are created with noses fashioned from a Cure Decor, dropping it upon being purified. Joker created later models like the blue-nosed Akanbes, Joker's personal yellow-nosed Akanbe, and others.

 Constructs of Negative Energy initially used by Pierrot in his attack on Märchenland. After Pierrot resurrects on Earth, the Despair Giants are summoned to cover the planet in darkness before being absorbed by Pierrot. ;
 Pierrot's personal army of monsters created from black ink that normally able to regenerate at a fast rate, conjures the monster army to overwhelm the Precure before they acquired their Royale Mode forms that allowed them to obliterate his creations as he absorbs them in response.

Clones of the PreCures created by Joker using the last Cure Decor and the Three Commanders' expunged darkness, being dark reflections who seek to prove their superiority to the originals. Each Bad End Cure separates her original from the others to engage in one-on-one death matches, only to be destroyed while serving their purpose to keep the PreCures from preventing Pierot's resurrection.

Supporting characters

Family members 

Miyuki's mother.

Miyuki’s father.

Miyuki's grandmother who lives alone in the countryside. Her unfaltering optimism makes her incapable of falling into despair.

Akane's father. He runs the okonomiyaki shop "Akane", named after his daughter because it opened after her birth.

Akane's mother. She doesn't help her husband's business because she can't cook herself.

Akane's younger brother, a freshman in the basketball club in Nanairogaoka Public Middle School.

Yayoi's mother, who works as a fashion stage manager for Fairy Drop.

 

Yayoi's late father who gave Yayoi her name.

Nao's mother.

Nao's father.

Nao's five younger siblings. In order of age, the 3rd and 4th ones are girls, the rest are boys.

Reika's mother, who is an aikido expert.

Reika's older brother, who is now a judo protégé.

Reika's grandfather, who is a Japanese calligraphy expert.

Other characters 

The homeroom teacher for class 2-2.

 

 A foreign exchange student from the UK.

 
 
 A middle school teacher.

 Fujiwara

An owarai comedy duo who guest star in episode 17.

A policeman that where Majorina meets she loses her inventions and usually Majorina leaves running off without saying good-bye.

Minor characters 

The student council president in Nanairogaoka Public Middle School, he's a handsome guy and very popular among female students.

The student council clerk in Nanairogaoka Public Middle School.

Movie characters
These were major characters in the film Smile PreCure! The Movie: Big Mismatch in a Picture Book!

A purple-haired girl who lived with a fairytale picture book that played a role in shaping Miyuki's outlook as a child.

The main antagonist in the film, a purple bird-like Dragon who was initially the villain of Nico's story. He corrupted Nico to act on her grudge toward Miyuki. But when Nico discards her hatred toward the girl, Demon King personally attacked the Pretty Cure before being purified by Ultra Cure Happy.

Media

Anime

The 48-episode Smile PreCure! anime aired on TV Asahi and other Japanese stations between February 5, 2012 and January 27, 2013, replacing Suite PreCure♪ in its previous timeslot. All three songs are composed by Hideaki Takatori. A Blu-ray Box Set by Marvelous AQL and TC Entertainment was released on October 26, 2012, in the same fashion as Suite PreCure. Standard DVD releases were also issued.

Saban Brands under its SCG Characters unit, have licensed the series outside of Asia under the name Glitter Force, releasing it as a Netflix exclusive. This version consists of 40 episodes, with twenty episodes released on Netflix on December 18, 2015 and the other twenty released on August 26, 2016. The adaptation, which was dubbed into English by Studiopolis, features changes to character names, terminology, and music. Glitter Force also skipped eight episodes and the film from the original Japanese version. The opening theme is "Glitter Force", performed by Blush, who also perform various insert songs. Shirley Pelts wrote that "Netflix is investing heavily in legacy cartoons such as Popples and Glitter Force, which it considers to be important toy and entertainment brands." The show is currently licensed by Hasbro.

The English version was later broadcast on London Live in the United Kingdom in July 2017.

Feature films
The heroines appear in the Pretty Cure All Stars cross-over movie series, first appearing in the fourth entry, Pretty Cure All Stars New Stage: Friends of the Future, which was released in Japanese theatres on March 17, 2012 and on DVD on July 18, 2012.

A film based on the series, titled  was released in Japanese theaters on October 27, 2012. It debuted at the number-one spot in the Japanese Box Office and earned a total revenue of ¥193,000,000 (US$2.42 million), and was the highest grossing PreCure movie to date.

Soundtracks
The music in the anime is composed and arranged by Yasuharu Takanashi, who previously composed the other Pretty Cure series Fresh Pretty Cure!, HeartCatch PreCure! and Suite PreCure. The official soundtrack to the series is divided into two editions, "PreCure Sound Parade!!" and "PreCure Sound Rainbow!!". There are also three vocal albums as well: "Spread out! Smile World!!", "Hey, Everyone Smile!!" and the vocal best album along with the movie's official soundtrack. The background music in the Saban dub is composed by Noam Kaniel (Noam) (who worked on X-Men, Code Lyoko, W.I.T.C.H., Power Rangers, Digimon Fusion, & Miraculous Ladybug). The songs from the Saban version were performed by the girl group Blush.

Manga
A manga adaptation by Futago Kamikita began serialization in Kodansha's Nakayoshi magazine in March 2012 and ended in February 2013.

Merchandise
Merchandise of the anime were also issued during the series's initial run including bags, watches, raincoats, etc. Several toys featuring the Cure's transformation devices and weapons were also released by Bandai during the series' airing. Some of the Cures were also released as part of Bandai's long running S.H. Figuarts line of collectors figures.

Video game
A video game titled  was developed by Namco Bandai Games and released in Japan for the Nintendo 3DS on August 2, 2012. The game sees the Cures take on the roles of various fairy tales such as Snow White, The Tortoise and the Hare, Cinderella and Hansel and Gretel.

Reception
The original Japanese version was well-received, placing regularly in Japan's weekly top ten anime shows broadcast.

Brad Stephenson of About.com describes the English adaptation as "a return to when anime was fun and the priority of everyone involved was to make a super accessible series that could be enjoyed by as many people as possible." He liked the variety of animation for the physical attacks, the energetic singing of Blush, and that "young English-speaking children can have the same experience as the Japanese audience did when they first saw it." He also found the Japanese references to not be a deterrent and would encourage kids to look into Japanese culture as with Sailor Moon.

Ella Anders of BSC Kids, who had also reviewed many other recent magical girl adaptations such as LoliRock and Miraculous Ladybug, thought the series was better than she expected, but disliked the amount of localization provided by the Saban dub, writing that the "With the world so interconnected as it is now the removal of cultural aspects was saddening. It would be such a great chance to celebrate and focus on the Japanese culture."

Jacob Robinson of What's On Netflix critically panned the Glitter Force adaptation, prefacing his review by stating that he most certainly does not recommend the English dub, calling the script "overly cheesy, girly and downright criminal cliché". Robinson also stated that Smile Precure would have been much more bearable to watch in Japanese.

The Glitter Force dub was cited as an example in a The Mary Sue article on the subs vs. dubs debate.

Emily Ashby of Common Sense Media argued that while the anime "doesn't dazzle," the strong female leads shine through. Ashby also argued that the series comes across "feeling silly and superficial" and said that the show is a "mild assault on the visual and auditory senses" through the "glitter" transformations. She said that the latter is unfortunate as it is a "decent story with strong, appealing female role models."

Notes

References

External links

  (Toei Animation) 
  at Netflix
 Anime official website at ABC / Asahi TV 
 

2012 anime films
2012 anime television series debuts
2013 Japanese television series endings
2012 manga
Bandai Namco franchises
Magical girl anime and manga
Netflix original anime
Netflix children's programming
Pretty Cure
Television series by Hasbro Studios
Television series by Saban Capital Group
Toei Animation films
Toei Animation television
TV Asahi original programming
Fictional fairies and sprites
Anime and manga based on fairy tales
Television about fairies and sprites
Isekai anime and manga
Mythology in anime and manga